The Poetry Society is a membership organisation, open to all, whose stated aim is "to promote the study, use and enjoyment of poetry". The society was founded in London in February 1909 as the Poetry Recital Society, becoming the Poetry Society in 1912. Its first president was Lady Margaret Sackville.

From its current premises in Covent Garden, London, The Poetry Society publishes Poetry Review, Britain's leading poetry magazine. Established in 1912, it provides a forum for poems from both new and established poets. Its current editor is the poet Emily Berry, who succeeded Maurice Riordan in 2017. The magazine's editor from 2005 to 2012 was Fiona Sampson.

There is a Poetry Café on the ground floor of the Poetry Society's premises, and performance space in the basement, rooms being available for hire.

Awards
The society organises several competitions, including the British National Poetry Competition, the Foyle Young Poets of the Year Award, The Popescu Prize, The Ted Hughes Award for New Work in Poetry and the Geoffrey Dearmer Award. The society also ran the Alice Hunt Bartlett Prize from 1986 to 1997.

References

External links
 

Poetry organizations
British writers' organisations
1909 establishments in the United Kingdom
Arts organizations established in 1909
British poetry